The Bloody Wood is a 1966 detective novel by the British writer Michael Innes. It is the nineteenth in his long-running series featuring Sir John Appleby of Scotland Yard. It takes the form of a Golden Age-style country house mystery.

Synopsis
Appleby and his wife Judith are amongst the guests at Charne, the estate of Charles Martineau. Martineau's wife Grace is very ill, and one of her final requests is that her husband should marry her favourite niece Martine. When both Grace and Charles die on the same day, Apple steps in to investigate.

References

Bibliography
 Hubin, Allen J. Crime Fiction, 1749-1980: A Comprehensive Bibliography. Garland Publishing, 1984.
 Reilly, John M. Twentieth Century Crime & Mystery Writers. Springer, 2015.
 Scheper, George L. Michael Innes. Ungar, 1986.

1966 British novels
British mystery novels
British crime novels
Novels by Michael Innes
Novels set in England
British detective novels
Victor Gollancz Ltd books